St. Marys is a civil parish in County Westmeath, Ireland.

St. Mary's is the sole civil parish in the barony of Brawny in the Province of Leinster.

St. Mary's civil parish comprises part of the town of Athlone, the village of Ballykeeran and 62 townlands: Aghacocara, Ankersbower, Ardnaglug, Athlone, Ballygowlan, Ballykeeran, Blyry Lower, Blyry Upper, Bunnahinly, Bunnavally, Cannonsfield, Cappankelly, Carrickobreen, Cartrontroy, Cloghanboy (Cooke), Cloghanboy (Homan), Cloghanboy (Strain), Cloghanboy West, Clonagh, Clonbrusk, Cloonbonny, Cloondalin, Collegeland, Cookanamuck, Coosan, Cornamaddy, Cornamagh, Corralena, Creaghduff, Creaghduff South, Creggan Lower, Creggan Upper, Crosswood, Curragh, Curragh (Mechum), Derries, Friars Island, Garrankesh, Garrycastle, Garrynafela, Goldenisland (St. George), Goldenisland, Goldenisland (Kilmaine), Hillquarter, Kilmacuagh (Castlemaine), Kilmacuagh (Cooke), Kilmacuagh (Mechum), Kilnafaddoge, Kippinstown, Lissywollen, Loughanaskin, Loughandonning, Magheranerla, Meehan, Moydrum (West), Retreat, Srameen, Tullin, Tullycross and
Warrensfields.

The neighbouring civil parishes are: Kilkenny West to the north, Ballyloughloe to the east, Kilcleagh to the south–east and St. Peter's (County Roscommon) to the west.

References

External links
St. Mary's civil parish at the IreAtlas Townland Data Base
St. Mary's civil parish at townlands.ie
St. Mary's civil parish at The Placenames Database of Ireland

Civil parishes of County Westmeath